Miriam and Ira D. Wallach Art Gallery is the principal public visual arts space and art museum of the Columbia University in New York.

History 
Established in 1986, it advances the university's "historical, critical, and creative engagement with the visual arts." The current director of the Wallach Art Gallery is Betti-Sue Hertz. Since 2017, the gallery has been located at the Lenfest Center for the Arts in Harlem, a building designed by the Italian contemporary architect Renzo Piano. Wallach's curatorial focus on traditionally under-represented artists, including local Harlem artists, has been described as a "welcome decision" by the The New York Times.

In 2018, Wallach Art Gallery hosted the critically acclaimed exhibition titled Posing Modernity: The Black Model From Manet and Matisse to Today and curated by the American scholar of African American art Denise Murrell, which examined the depictions of people of color in European modern art. The exhibition later traveled to Musée d'Orsay in Paris where it was expanded with more works of canonical French 19th-century painters, including Édouard Manet's Olympia painted in 1863.

References 

Museums in the United States
Museums in New York City
Art museums and galleries
Columbia University
Harlem
New York City